Rafael Flores Mendoza (born 5 October 1968) is a Mexican politician affiliated with the Party of the Democratic Revolution. As of 2014 he served as Deputy of the LIX Legislature of the Mexican Congress representing Zacatecas.

References

1968 births
Living people
Members of the Chamber of Deputies (Mexico)
Party of the Democratic Revolution politicians
Universidad Regiomontana alumni
National Autonomous University of Mexico alumni
University of Salamanca alumni
21st-century Mexican politicians
Politicians from Zacatecas
People from Guadalupe, Zacatecas